The 1911–12 Divizia A was the third season of Divizia A, the top-level football league of Romania.

Final table

References

1911-12
1911–12 in European association football leagues
1911–12 in Romanian football